The Politics of Xiangtan in Hunan province in the People's Republic of China is structured in a dual party-government system like all other governing institutions in mainland China. 

The Mayor of Xiangtan is the highest-ranking official in the People's Government of Xiangtan or Xiangtan Municipal Government. However, in the city's dual party-government governing system, the Mayor has less power than the Communist Party of Xiangtan Municipal Committee Secretary, colloquially termed the "CPC Party Chief of Xiangtan" or "Communist Party Secretary of Xiangtan".

History
Chen Sanxin was probed on suspicion of serious disciplinary violations by the Central Commission for Discipline Inspection (CCDI) in May 2018.

On March 27, 2019, Zhang Yingchun was elected mayor of Xiangtan. She became the first woman to win the office since 1949.

List of mayors of Xiangtan

List of CPC Party secretaries of Xiangtan

References

Xiangtan
Xiangtan